Hallébourg is a community in the Canadian province of Ontario, located in the unincorporated geographic township of Kendall in Cochrane District. The community is located on Highway 11 between the incorporated municipalities of Mattice-Val-Côté and Hearst.

The community is counted as part of Cochrane, Unorganized, North Part in Canadian census data.

Communities in Cochrane District
Local services boards in Ontario